JS Wakasa (AGS-5104) was a Futami-class oceanographic research ship for the Japan Maritime Self-Defense Force.

Construction and career 
Wakasa was laid down on 21 August 1984 and launched on 21 May 1985 by Hitachi Zosen Corporation Maizuru Shipyard. She was commissioned on 25 February 1986 and was incorporated into the Marine Service Corps and deployed in Yokosuka.

The fishing boat Kiyotoku Maru (7.3t), whose hull was cut off after colliding with JS Atago on February 18, 2008, was towed together with JS Muroto.

On September 18, 2009, Naoko Matsuo, 3rd class Kaisa (at that time), was appointed as the first female captain of the Maritime Self-Defense Force, and became a hot topic.

In response to the Great East Japan Earthquake caused by the 2011 off the Pacific coast of Tohoku Earthquake, she departs from Yokosuka for disaster relief. At 2:42 pm on March 21, she shipped relief supplies to the Ishinomaki City Oshika General Branch. She returned to Yokosuka on March 28th.

On December 1, 2015, the Oceanographic Command Group was reorganized into the Oceanographic Command and Anti-submarine Support Group, and was incorporated into the 1st Oceanographic Observatory, which was newly formed under the same group.

Gallery

Citations

References 
 Takao Ishibashi "All Maritime Self-Defense Force Ships 1952-2002" (Namiki Shobo, 2002).
 "World Ships Special Edition 66th Collection Maritime Self-Defense Force All Ship History" (Gaijinsha, 2004)

1985 ships
Futami-class oceanographic research ships
Ships built by Hitachi Zosen Corporation